The 2011 Central Michigan Chippewas football team represented Central Michigan University in the 2011 NCAA Division I FBS football season. The Chippewas were led by second year head coach Dan Enos and played their home games at Kelly/Shorts Stadium. They are a member of the West Division of the Mid-American Conference. They finished the season 3–9, 2–6 in MAC play for the second time in two years and finished last in the West Division.

Schedule

References

Central Michigan Chippewas
Central Michigan Chippewas football seasons
Central Michigan Chippewas football